Yoga Prakash Malla, also spelled Yogprakash, (Nepali: योगप्रकाश मल्ल) was a Malla dynasty king and the King of Patan. He succeeded Mahindrasimha Malla and reigned from 1722 until his death in 1729.

Life 
His ancestry is still a topic of debates among scholars. Many agree that he was a prince of Bhadgaon and was exiled because he was born under the wrong astrological sign. It could also be the situation that Yogamati had installed Yogaprakash as the king as she was still influential at that time. He was also a religious monarch like his predecessors and donated several items to temples and guthis.

He died in 1729 and was succeeded by Vishnu Malla, a descendant of Srinivasa Malla.

References 

18th-century Nepalese people
Nepalese monarchs
1729 deaths